Boško Stupić (born 27 June 1984) is a Bosnian footballer who plays for Kyran in the Kazakhstan First League.

Club career
Born in Mostar, SR Bosnia and Herzegovina, he has played for Bosnian club FK Leotar, FK Mladost Velika Obarska, FK Hercegovac Bileća, Serbian OFK Mladenovac and Macedonian clubs FK Sileks FK Vardar, FK Rabotnički and FK Pelister.  In July 2015 he signed with FK Novi Pazar.

References

External links
 Profile and stats at Playersfriends.

1984 births
Living people
Footballers from Sarajevo
Serbs of Bosnia and Herzegovina
Association football forwards
Bosnia and Herzegovina footballers
FK Leotar players
OFK Mladenovac players
FK Sileks players
FK Vardar players
NK Istra 1961 players
FK Olimpik players
FK Rabotnički players
FK Bregalnica Štip players
FK Pelister players
FK Novi Pazar players
OFK Titograd players
FC Kyzylzhar players
FC Kyran players
Premier League of Bosnia and Herzegovina players
Second League of Serbia and Montenegro players
Macedonian First Football League players
Croatian Football League players
Montenegrin First League players
Kazakhstan Premier League players
Kazakhstan First Division players
Bosnia and Herzegovina expatriate footballers
Expatriate footballers in Serbia and Montenegro
Bosnia and Herzegovina expatriate sportspeople in Serbia and Montenegro
Expatriate footballers in North Macedonia
Bosnia and Herzegovina expatriate sportspeople in North Macedonia
Expatriate footballers in Croatia
Bosnia and Herzegovina expatriate sportspeople in Croatia
Expatriate footballers in Serbia
Bosnia and Herzegovina expatriate sportspeople in Serbia
Expatriate footballers in Montenegro
Bosnia and Herzegovina expatriate sportspeople in Montenegro
Expatriate footballers in Kazakhstan
Bosnia and Herzegovina expatriate sportspeople in Kazakhstan